Young's Scouts was a select group of United States Army soldiers during the Philippine–American War organized under a Vermont civilian named William Henry Young.

Unit history
Because of his previous experience as a soldier and soldier of fortune and his demonstrated coolness under fire, Young came to the notice of General Henry W. Lawton, who hired Young as his Chief Scout during Lawton's Northern Campaign. Young had served with the Army in the Nez Perce War, prospected for gold in California and Montana and worked as a soldier of fortune and mine supervisor in Korea and China.  He made his way to the Philippines to prospect for gold.

Young's Scouts acted as an advance guard and engaged in search and destroy missions. The exploits and valor of Young's Scouts soon brought them to the attention of the American public.

Members of Young's Scouts came from several units in Lawton's command, including the 1st North Dakota Volunteers, the 2nd Oregon Volunteers, and the 4th U.S. Cavalry (dismounted). Although the original unit was composed of 25 men, Scouts came and went as casualties and sickness took their toll. In two different engagements a number of Scouts were recommended for the Medal of Honor, which at the time was the only Army award for valor.

On May 14, 1899, William Young was wounded in the knee in an engagement at San Miguel de Mayumo with what was described as a minor wound. He was conveyed to the 1st Reserve Hospital in Manila with a request by Lawton that he receive the best of care. Ironically, although the initial assessment of Young's wound was that he would probably end up with nothing more serious than a stiff knee, he died a few days later, presumably of tetanus.

Young's Scouts continued to operate under several different officers for the remainder of Lawton's Northern Campaign.

Gallery

Medal of Honor recipients
Captain William Edward Birkhimer (commander). Birkhimer later retired as a brigadier general
Corporal Frank LaFayette Anders, who became a geologist and historian
Private Otto Boehler
Private Charles P. Davis
Private Willis H. Downs
Private Frank Charles High
Private Gotfred Jensen Jensen later retired as a Sergeant
Private John Baxter Kinne
Private Richard Moses Longfellow
Private Edward Eugene Lyon
Private Peter H. Quinn
Private Marcus William Robertson
Private Frank Fulton Ross
Private Thomas Sletteland

References

Sources
Soldiers In The Sun ............. San Isidro, Luzon, Philippine Islands, May 6, 1899
Dakota Datebook May 14, 2004 "Philippine–American War"

Further reading

 

Military units and formations of the United States in the Philippine–American War
Military units and formations in Oregon